The 2009 Papua earthquakes occurred on January 4 local time in Indonesia's West Papua province. The very large earthquake doublet comprised a  7.6 initial shock that had a maximum Mercalli intensity of VI (Strong) and a second event measuring  7.4 and a maximum Mercalli intensity of VII (Very strong). The events took place less than three hours apart to the east-northeast of Sorong on the Bird's Head Peninsula and left at least four people dead and dozens injured.

An official of World Vision International, a humanitarian aid organization, said ten buildings had been destroyed, including several hotels and the house of a government official. Officials said three people, who had been staying at the Mutiara hotel in the city of Manokwari, were pulled alive from the rubble and taken to a hospital. Two hotels collapsed in the quake. There have been twenty-three aftershocks above magnitude 5.0 and another at magnitude 6.0. The earthquakes were also felt in nearby Papua New Guinea and Darwin, Australia.

See also
List of earthquakes in 2009
List of earthquakes in Indonesia

References

External links
 
 
 
 

 

Earthquake in Papua, Indonesia – NASA Earth Observatory

2009 tsunamis
Papua earthquake
Papua (province)
West Papua (province)
Papua earthquake
Earthquakes in Indonesia
Tsunamis in Indonesia
January 2009 events in Asia